Baron Sámuel (Samu) Jósika de Branyicska (23 August 1848 – 4 June 1923) was a Hungarian politician, who served as Minister besides the King between 1895 and 1898. After the Treaty of Trianon he was the leader of the Hungarian minority's main party (Országos Magyar Párt) in Transylvania after it became part of the Kingdom of Romania.

External links
Magyar Életrajzi Lexikon

1848 births
1923 deaths
Politicians from Salzburg
Foreign ministers of Hungary
Speakers of the House of Magnates
Samuel
Knights of the Golden Fleece of Austria
Lord-lieutenants of a county in Hungarian Kingdom